Petrislav (fl. 1060–1083) was the Prince of Raška, a province under the Grand Principality of Doclea, from 1060 to 1083. He was appointed to govern Raška by his father, Grand Prince Mihailo I, who had reunited Raška (the Zagora region of the former early medieval Serbian Principality) into the Serbian realm after decades of Byzantine annexation.

Background
Bosnia, Zahumlje and Rascia never were incorporated into an integrated state with Doclea. Each principality had its own nobility and institutions, simply requiring a member of the royal family to rule as Prince or Duke.

Life
Petrislav was the last son of Mihailo I and his Greek second wife.

Mihailo I reconquered Rascia from the Byzantines between 1060 and 1074. He appointed Petrislav as Prince of Rascia. Mihailo I died in 1081, and Constantine Bodin succeeded as Prince.  By 1085, the Vojislavljević brothers suppressed the revolt in the župa of Zeta, staged by their cousins, the sons of Radoslav. Constantine Bodin ruled unchallengedly.

He was succeeded by his two sons, Vukan and Marko, in 1083.

References

Sources

Curta, Florin (2006). Southeastern Europe in the Middle Ages, 500-1250. Cambridge University Press. .
Ćorović, Vladimir, Istorija srpskog naroda, Book I, (In Serbian) Electric Book, Rastko Electronic Book, Antikvarneknjige (Cyrillic)
Drugi Period, IV: Pokrštavanje Južnih Slovena
Istorija Srpskog Naroda, Srbi između Vizantije, Hrvatske i Bugarske
The Serbs, . Wiley-Blackwell, 2004, Google Books.
Tibor Živković, Portreti srpskih vladara (IX—XII), Beograd, 2006, p. 11

External links

11th-century Serbian royalty
11th-century rulers in Europe
Vojislavljević dynasty
Medieval Serbian people of Greek descent
Year of birth unknown